Bidwill is a surname. Notable people with the surname include:

Arthur J. Bidwill (1903–1985), American politician
Bill Bidwill (1931–2019), American businessman and sports franchise owner
Charles Bidwill (1895–1947), American businessman, father of Bill Bidwill
John Carne Bidwill (1815–1853), a botanist the suburb was named after
Michael Bidwill (born 1964), American football executive, son of Bill Bidwill
Violet Bidwill or Violet Bidwill Wolfner (1900–1962), American football owner, wife of Charles Bidwell

See also
Bidwell (surname)